The 2015 Vietnamese National Football Second League was the 17th season of the Vietnamese National Football Second League

Team changes
The following teams have changed division since the 2014 season.

To Vietnamese Second League
Promoted from Vietnamese Third Division
 Mancons Sài Gòn
 Bình Định

Relegated from V.League 2
 XM Fico Tây Ninh

From Vietnamese Second League
Relegated to Vietnamese Third Division
 none
Promoted to V.League 2
 Nam Định
 Phú Yên
 Bình Phước
 Công An Nhân Dân

League stage

Group A

Group B

Final stage

Semi-finals

Play-off

References

External links
Official Page

2
2015